The 1859 Shamakhi earthquake struck Shamakhi in the Baku Governorate (present-day Azerbaijan Republic) of the Russian Empire, on 11 June. The earthquake had an estimated magnitude of 5.9 and caused moderate damage and killed approximately 100 people.

See also
 List of earthquakes in Azerbaijan

References 

Earthquakes in Azerbaijan
19th century in Azerbaijan
1859 earthquakes
1859 in the Russian Empire 
1859 disasters in the Russian Empire 
June 1859 events
Baku Governorate